Jeff Schneider (born 1960, Bethesda, Maryland) is an American artist.

Life and work 

Early on, Schneider showed a keen interest in photography often shooting and processing up to one hundred feet of black & white film a week. Growing increasingly tired of the representational aspects of photography, through darkroom manipulations, Schneider began to essentially abstract the "objectivity" of the camera lens. One of his professors at the University of South Florida suggested he enroll in a figure drawing and art theory class.  Not long after these initial steps into fine art, Schneider attended the 1980 Picasso Retrospective at the Museum of Modern Art in New York City. This exhibition confirmed his desire to become an artist.

After he received his BFA in 1983 from Miami University, he worked as an Art Director in commercial design, painting at night in garages and basements until he acquired a studio in downtown Cincinnati. Soon after, he received a scholarship to the graduate painting program at the University of Cincinnati. Working with Robert Knipschild and Frank Herrmann he received his master's degree of Fine Art in 1989. Schneider moved to New York City in 1990 to pursue his career in art and quickly became an integral part of the vibrant painting scene there.

Early in New York, Schneider worked as a studio assistant for many of New York's most recognized artists, notably Moira Dryer, Ron Gorchov, Dorothea Rockburne, Janet Fish, Chuck Close and David Salle. By taking advantage of their generational perspectives, this allowed the young artist to see first hand the inner workings of not only their relevant studios but also the gallery system that these artist’s worked within.

His early exhibitions included "Presentational Painting" curated by Sanford Wumfeld and Eileen Roaman at Hunter College and the “East-West Cultural Studies” painting show curated by Robert Storr, a relationship that led to numerous projects with Storr at the Museum of Modern Art.
As scenes shifted, Schneider began to show his work with a gallery in Williamsburg, Brooklyn formed by Leah Stuhltrager and Cris Dam, which would lead to three group exhibitions. Schneider’s work was seen as “A blending of male androgyny and American pop cultural” his reference to the "Cowboy Philosopher"  "...reinforced the patriarchal power dynamic juxtaposed with the sometimes vulnerable and otherwise unassuming female character.” His canvases, "...Sophisticatedly staged by the artist, draw on inferences through association in our society and culture." The narratives struck an accord in the Brooklyn art scene as Schneider continued to exhibit throughout the borough as well as, Manhattan. The relationship with the Dam Stuhltrager Gallery led to his first international exhibition in Madrid, Spain. Schneider, along with Loren Munk, Cris Dam and William Powhida exhibited at Galeria ArteVeintiuno, curated by Javier Duero from the Museo Reina Sofia.

After the exhibition in Madrid Schneider continued to focus on the European art scene which led to numerous exhibitions with Hillsboro Fine Art in Dublin, Ireland. Aidan Dunne of the Irish Times declared Schneider’s work as “lively explorations of the mythology of the cowboy-gunslinger, treated humorously and with deftness of touch.” Schneider has continued to exhibit in art fairs and galleries throughout Europe, as well as, exhibitions in Chicago, Miami and New York. He has exhibited with noted artists, Julian Schnabel, Ross Bleckner and Donald Baechler as well as other New York artists and has lectured on his work at Hunter College in New York and the Dun Laoghaire Institute of Art in Dublin.

The Oliver Sears Gallery represents Schneider’s work in Europe and in the United States.

Schneider currently resides and works in New York City.

Selected exhibitions 
 2021 Museum of Biblical Art / Ground Zero 360 / Dallas, Texas
 2020 Oliver Sears Gallery / The Time of our Lives / Dublin, Ireland
 2019 VUE art fair / Oliver Sears Gallery / Dublin, Ireland
 2019 Mosaic ArtSpace / Solo Exhibition / Queens, New York
 2019 SO Fine Art Editions / Summer Group Show / Dublin, Ireland
 2019 Oliver Sears Gallery / In Living Memory at Emo Court / County Laois / Ireland
 2019 Oliver Sears Gallery / Press Play / Dublin, Ireland
 2018 VUE art fair / Oliver Sears Gallery / Dublin, Ireland
 2018 Oliver Sears Gallery / Salon, Selected works / Dublin Ireland 
 2018 The Factory LIC / Summer Exhibition 2018 / Long Island City, NY
 2017 ArtProv Gallery / Figure & Form / Providence, RI
 2016 Oliver Sears Gallery / London Art Fair / London, UK
 2015 ArtProv Gallery / Art Basel Miami Beach / Miami FL
 2015 Oliver Sears Gallery / In Residence / London, UK
 2015 ArtProv Gallery / Clothing Optional / Providence, RI
 2015 One Art Space / Williamsburg on Warren / New York, New York
 2015 Royal Hibernian Academy 185th Annual Exhibition / Dublin, Ireland
 2015 Oliver Sears Gallery / Jeff Schneider & Nest Design / Dublin, Ireland
 2014 ArtProv Gallery / Patterns and Perspectives / Providence, RI
 2013	So Fine Art Editions / National Contemporary Art Fair 2013 / Dublin, Ireland
 2012	Royal Hibernian Academy  182 Annual Exhibition (invited artist)	/ Dublin, Ireland
 2011 Hillsboro Fine Art / New York Paintings / Ross Bleckner and Jeff Schneider / Dublin, Ireland
 2011	Allen Gallery / Brooklyn Academy of Music / Annual Benefit Auction / Brooklyn, New York
 2010	Allen Gallery / Brooklyn Academy of Music / Annual Benefit Auction / Brooklyn, New York
 2009	Hillsboro Fine Art / New York Contemporary / Donald Baechler, Ross Bleckner, Julian Schnabel, Jeff Schneider / Dublin, Ireland
 2009	Allen Gallery / Private ROOM / New York, New York 
 2008	Allen Gallery / Up For Grabs / New York, New York
 2008 Dam Stuhltrager Gallery / Palette-Poles / Brooklyn, New York
 2006	Galeria ArteVeintiuno /  Swap-Americana / Madrid, Spain
 2005	Dam Stuhltrager Gallery / These Days / Brooklyn, New York

References

External links 
 www.jeffschneidernyc.com

American artists
1960 births
Living people